Sydenham College of Economics is a college located in Mumbai, Maharashtra, India. It is affiliated to the Dr. Homi Bhabha State University. The college offers undergraduate and postgraduate degrees in management. It was awarded a re-accreditation 'A' grade and 3.42 GPA in the second cycle assessment conducted by the National Assessment and Accreditation Council.

History
Sydenham College was established in October 1913. It was named after the then-governor of Bombay, Lord Sydenham of Combe, K.S. Aiyar acted as first honorary principal of the college. The economist Percy Anstey was appointed Principal in 1914, a position he held until his death in 1920. It was only in 1941, twenty-eight years after the establishment of Sydenham College, that any other institute started offering courses in the subject. Indian Jurist and intellectual Dr. B.R. Ambedkar was a lecturer of the college.

On the college's seventy-fifth anniversary in 1988, the Indian Post Office issued a commemorative stamp.

In the year 2019, Sydenham college was de-affiliated from Mumbai University and affiliated to Dr. Homi Bhabha State University.

Location

 1913: The college was run from the Elphinstone College premises in Fort.
 1914–1922: The college moved to the Whiteway Laidlaw Building on Hornby Road, near the present-day Handloom House in Fort.
 1922–1955: The college was on the premises of the present-day Sir J. J. College of Architecture in Fort, opposite the Victoria Terminus railway station. It was then known as the Indo-British Institute.
 1955 onward: In 1955, Sydenham College moved to its current location on "B Road" at Churchgate, very near the terminus of the Western Railway section of the Mumbai suburban railway. It is close to the Marine Drive sea front on the Arabian Sea.

Courses offered

 Government aided courses
 Higher Secondary Certificate - Commerce
 Bachelor of Commerce (since 1913)
 Master of Commerce (since 1925)

 Self financed courses
 Bachelor of Management Studies 
 Bachelor of Commerce (Banking and Insurance) (since 2003)
 NSE Certified Market Professional Course
 Vocational Course in Foreign Trade

Notable alumni

Business
Akbar Al Baker, CEO of Qatar Airways
Ashwin Choksi Entrepreneur, Non-executive chairman of Asian Paints Ltd
Keki Mistry, Vice Chairman and CEO of HDFC
Deepak Parekh, Chairman HDFC
Girish Paranjpe, joint CEO Wipro Technologies
Krish Iyer, President and CEO Walmart India
Kumar Mangalam Birla
Dilip Piramal, Chairman VIP Industries
Harsh Mariwala, founder and Chairman of Marico
Nimesh Kampani, Chairman, JM Financial Services Pvt. Ltd.
Niranjan Hiranandani, Entrepreneur, Co-founder & MD - Hirandani Group
Pramit Jhaveri, CEO, Citi India
Rakesh Jhunjhunwala, Investor & Trader
Ronnie Screwvala, Chairman, UTV
Sanjiv Mehta, owner, East India Company London
Uday S Kotak, Chairman Kotak Mahindra
Yogesh Mahansaria, Founder and CEO multinational Alliance Tire Group
Bhavin Turakhia, Founder of Flock, Ringo, Radix and Zeta.
Education
 Gita Johar, Professor of Business, Columbia Business School
 Indu Shahani, Founding Dean of the Indian School of Management & Entrepreneurship (ISME)
 Jagdish Bhagwati, Economist and Professor of Economics at Columbia University

Film, theatre and television
 Aditya Chopra, Director & Producer
 Atul Agnihotri, Actor & Director
 Emraan Hashmi, Actor
 Fazila Allana, notable TV producer, founder and MD of Sol Production Pvt. Ltd.
 Gayatri Joshi, Indian actress known for her role in Hindi film Swades
 Hrithik Roshan, Actor
 Juhi Chawla, Actress and Femina Miss India Universe 1984
 Karanvir Bohra, Television Actor
 Lymaraina D'Souza, Indian model and Femina Miss India Universe 1998
 Rahul Bose, Actor
 Uday Chopra, Actor
 Milan Luthria, Director
 Sameera Reddy, Indian film actress
 Sanaya Irani, Television Actress
 Sanjay Gupta, film director
 Shamita Shetty, Indian film actress
 Sheetal Mallar, Indian supermodel
 Shiamak Davar, dancer and singer
 Suchitra Krishnamoorthi, Indian pop singer and actress
 Swapnil Joshi, TV actor-comedian
 Vinod Khanna, Actor
 Zeenat Aman, Indian film Actress
 Rajit Kapoor, Actor

 Politics and government
 Meera Sanyal, politician, formerly country head of ABN AMRO and RBS
 Milind Deora, Politician 
 Omar Abdullah, Politician
 Praful Patel, Politician
 Vinod Khanna, Politician & Film Actor
 Rais Shaikh, Politician
 Julio Riberio, IPS

 Others
 Dinesh D'Souza, Political commentator 
 Vijay Merchant, Cricketer
 Jawahar Bakshi, Gujarati poet
 Bhupen Khakhar, a leading artist in Indian contemporary art

See also
Government Colleges Hostel
H.R. College of Commerce and Economics
Kishinchand Chellaram College
Mithibai College
Jai Hind College
Narsee Monjee College of Commerce and Economics

References

External links
 

Universities and colleges in Mumbai
Affiliates of the University of Mumbai
Commerce colleges in India
Educational institutions established in 1913
Colleges in India
1913 establishments in India